A Wonderful Spell is a French-Swiss-Canadian film directed by Dominique Cabrera.

Plot 
Following a German raid during World War II the inmates of a psychiatric hospital in Flanders elude their overseers. In spite of their issues they strive to rejoin the normal citizens.

Cast

Release
In the UK a version with English subtitles was released.

References

External links 
 

2004 films
French drama films
Swiss drama films
Canadian drama films
2000s French-language films
French-language Swiss films
French-language Canadian films
2000s Canadian films
2000s French films